Eric Walter Richardson (23 July 1891 – 15 August 1969) was an Australian rules footballer who played with St Kilda in the Victorian Football League (VFL).

Notes

External links 

1891 births
1969 deaths
Australian rules footballers from Tasmania
St Kilda Football Club players
Launceston Football Club players